Bob Brookmeyer Quartet is an album by jazz trombonist and composer Bob Brookmeyer recorded in 1954 and originally released on the Pacific Jazz label as a 10-inch LP. The material is a mix of standards and originals. The Billboard review commented: "The music is in the modern groove, moody and interesting."

Track listing
All compositions by Bob Brookmeyer, except where noted.
 "Liberty Belle" – 2:47
 "Have You Met Miss Jones?" (Richard Rodgers, Lorenz Hart) – 3:22
 "Traditional Blues" (Traditional) – 2:34
 "Isn't It Romantic?" (Rodgers, Hart) – 2:36
 "Doe Eyes" (Red Mitchell) – 3:18
 "Red Devil" (Mitchell) – 3:09
 "Body and Soul" (Johnny Green, Edward Heyman, Robert Sour, Frank Eyton) – 3:19
 "Last Chance" – 2:50
Recorded at Van Gelder Studio in Hackensack, New Jersey on July 5, 1954 (tracks 1-3) and July 7, 1954 (tracks 4-8)

Personnel 
Bob Brookmeyer - valve trombone
John Williams – piano
Bill Anthony (tracks 1-3), Red Mitchell (tracks 4-8) – bass
Frank Isola – drums

References 

1954 albums
Pacific Jazz Records albums
Bob Brookmeyer albums
Albums produced by Richard Bock (producer)
Albums recorded at Van Gelder Studio